Cristopher Espuny Reynoso (born 30 October 1994), commonly known as Cristo, is a Spanish-born Dominican footballer who plays as a forward for Atlántico FC and the Dominican Republic national team. He is signed to Spanish club CF Amposta.

Club career
Formed in CF Amposta, Cristo alternates Amposta with Atlántico FC since the 2016 Liga Dominicana de Fútbol season.

International career
Cristo was eligible to play for Dominican Republic through his mother. He made his debut on 22 March 2018, playing an entire 4–0 friendly win against Turks and Caicos Islands

Honors and awards

Clubs
Atlántico
Liga Dominicana de Fútbol: 2017

References

External links

1994 births
Living people
Citizens of the Dominican Republic through descent
Dominican Republic footballers
Association football forwards
Liga Dominicana de Fútbol players
Dominican Republic international footballers
Dominican Republic people of Catalan descent
Spanish footballers
Footballers from Catalonia
Divisiones Regionales de Fútbol players
Spanish people of Dominican Republic descent
Sportspeople of Dominican Republic descent